Bank Millennium S.A. is a Poland-based commercial bank with headquarters in Warsaw, and owned by the Portuguese bank Millennium BCP. It is one of the largest banks in Poland and has been operating for 32 years. In 2018, it was the 7th bank in Poland in terms of asset value.

History

Bank Millennium SA was established in 1989 as Bank Inicjatyw Gospodarczych BIG SA. Initially, 98% of shares in it were owned by Warta, Poczta Polska, PZU, Universal and Transakcja foreign trade headquarters (KC PZPR and ZSMP), and 2% were held by natural persons. In 1992 the Bank's shares—the first shares of a financial institution—debuted on the Warsaw Stock Exchange. In 1997 the Bank merged with Bank Gdański SA (1997). A year later in cooperation with its Portuguese shareholder and partner Banco Comercial Portugues (BCP), the Bank launched the Millennium retail service network. Today BCP holds 50.1% shares of Bank Millennium.

May 31, 2019 Bank Millennium S.A. took over Euro Bank as a result of acquiring about 99.79% of the shares that were bought from Société Générale. On September 10, 2019, the Polish Financial Supervision Authority (KNF) granted permission to merge banks. On October 1, 2019, there was a legal merger, Bank Millennium and Euro Bank became one bank.

Operations 
The bank offers its services through a network of branches, online, phone and mobile banking to personal customers (in Retail, Prestige and Private Banking segments), to sole traders and microbusinesses as well as medium and large companies in the corporate banking segment.

In 2020, the bank had over 2.6 million active individual customers. In its development strategy, the bank focuses on modern service channels. The number of clients actively using electronic banking exceeded 2 million in 2020, and from the Millenet mobile and mobile application 1.7 million (+ 18% y/y).

Apart from the bank the most important companies in the Group are: Millennium Leasing (lease business), Millennium Dom Maklerski (brokerage business), Millennium TFI (mutual funds) and Millennium Goodie. The offerings of these companies complement the services and products offered by the bank. 
Joint Stock Company listed since 1992 on the Warsaw Stock Exchange in Warsaw. The bank's shares are included in WIG 30 and Respect Index indexes. Bank Millennium is now included in the FTSE4Good Emerging Index, which comprises companies from more than 20 countries, which stand out in terms of environmental efforts, corporate social responsibility and corporate governance.

Governing bodies
Management Board
 Joao Bras Jorge – Chairman of the Management Board
 Fernando Bicho – Deputy Chairman of the Management Board
 Wojciech Haase – Member of the Management Board
 Andrzej Gliński – Member of the Management Board
 Antonio Pinto – Member of the Management Board
 Wojciech Rybak – Member of the Management Board
 Jarosław Hermann – Member of the Management Board

Supervisory Board
 Bogusław Kott – Chairman,
 Nuno Manuel da Silva Amado – Deputy Chairman,
 Dariusz Rosati – Deputy Chairman and Secretary,
 Miguel de Campos Pereira de Bragança – Member of the Supervisory Board
 Agnieszka Hryniewicz-Bieniek – Member of the Supervisory Board (independent member)
 Anna Jakubowski – Member of the Supervisory Board (independent member)
 Grzegorz Jędrys – Member of the Supervisory Board (independent member)
 Andrzej Koźmiński – Member of the Supervisory Board
 Miguel Maya Dias Pinheiro – Member of the Supervisory Board
 Lingjiang Xu – Member of the Supervisory Board
 José Miguel Bensliman Schorcht da Silva Pessanha – Member of the Supervisory Board
 Alojzy Nowak – Member of the Supervisory Board

The Bank in numbers 
 Assets: 97.1 bn PLN
 Equity: 9.091 bn PLN
 Total deposits: 81.5 bn PLN
 Total loans: 74.088 bn PLN
 Net profit: 23 mil PLN
 Return on Equity (ROE): 0.2% 
 Total Capital Ratio (TCR): 19.5%

References

External links

 
 

Companies listed on the Warsaw Stock Exchange
Banks of Poland